Helgi Már Magnússon (born August 27, 1982) is an Icelandic basketball coach and former player who is currently the head coach of KR in the Icelandic Úrvalsdeild karla. As a player, he has won seven national championships in Iceland during his career.

Club career
In February 2016, Helgi won his first Icelandic Basketball Cup after having lost in his previous four cup finals.
Helgi announced is retirement from top level play following the 2015-2016 Úrvalsdeild season. but returned to the team in March 2018. A month later, Helgi won his sixth Icelandic championship after KR defeated Tindastóll in the Úrvalsdeild finals.

On 4 May 2019 he won his 7th national championship after KR beat ÍR in the Úrvalsdeild finals 3-2.

On 5 January 2020, he appeared in an Úrvalsdeild game for the fourth different decade.

National team career
Helgi played 95 games for the Icelandic national basketball team and participated at the EuroBasket 2015.

Coaching career
Helgi was a player coach for KR during the 2012–13 season. In August 2021, he was hired as the head coach of KR, replacing Darri Freyr Atlason who resigned following the 2020–21 season.

Personal life
Helgi's brother, Finnur Atli Magnússon, is a former member of the Icelandic national basketball team.

References

External links
Úrvalsdeild stats 1998-2002 at kki.is
Statistics 2011-2016 at realgm.com

1982 births
Living people
08 Stockholm Human Rights players
Catawba Indians men's basketball players
Helgi Mar Magnusson
Helgi Mar Magnusson
Helgi Mar Magnusson
Helgi Mar Magnusson
Helgi Mar Magnusson
Helgi Mar Magnusson
Helgi Mar Magnusson
Small forwards
Solna Vikings players
Helgi Mar Magnusson
Uppsala Basket players
Helgi Mar Magnusson
Helgi Mar Magnusson